Pockau-Lengefeld is a town in the district Erzgebirgskreis, in Saxony, Germany. It is situated in the Ore Mountains, 23 km southeast of Chemnitz. It was formed by the merger of the municipality Pockau and the town Lengefeld on 1 January 2014.

References 

 
Erzgebirgskreis